Al Hajar is an Arabic placename meaning the stone. It may refer to:

Al Hajar, Yemen, a village in Al Bayda' Governorate, Yemen
Al Hajar Mountains, located in northeastern Oman and eastern United Arab Emirates
Al Hajar, Saudi Arabia, a municipality in the Governorate of 'Ula, Medina Region

See also
Al Hajjarah, Sana'a Governorate, Yemen
Al-Hajarayn, Hadhramaut Governorate, Yemen
Hajera, alternate name of Shaharah, seat of Shaharah District, 'Amran Governorate, Yemen
Hajar (disambiguation)
Hajjar (disambiguation)